James Ross may refer to:

Politicians

Australia 
 James Ross (Australian lawyer) (1788–1865)
 James Ross (Australian politician) (1895–1975), New South Wales politician

Canada 
James Ross (MLA) (1814–1874), member of the Legislative Assembly of Quebec
James Ross (Ontario politician) (1817–1895)
James Gibb Ross (1819–1888), Canadian merchant and politician from the province of Quebec
James Ross (Alberta politician) (1851–1936)
James Alway Ross (1869–1945), politician and poet in Ontario, Canada
James Walker Ross (1885–1941)
J. Arthur Ross (1893–1958), Manitoba politician
James W. Ross (born 1938), Canadian senator

United States 
James Ross (Pennsylvania politician) (1762–1847), lawyer and senator from Pennsylvania, 1794–1803
James E. Ross (1921–1993), Pennsylvania state senator
Jim Ross (politician), former member of the Ohio House of Representatives

Sportsmen

Australia 
 Jim Ross (Australian footballer) (1927–2015), Australian rules footballer

Canada 
 Jim Ross (ice hockey) (1926–2016), Scottish-born Canadian ice hockey player

United Kingdom 
Jimmy Ross (footballer, born 1866) (1866–1902), Scottish association footballer
James Ross (rugby union) (1880–1914), Scottish rugby player
Jimmy Ross (footballer, born 1895), Scottish professional footballer

United States 
 Jim Ross (born 1952), wrestling executive and commentator

Other people

Canada 
James Ross (Canadian lawyer) (1835–1871), participant in Red River Rebellion
James Ross (Canadian businessman) (1848–1913), Scottish-born civil engineer and businessman
James Hamilton Ross (1856–1932), Yukon Territory Commissioner
James Sinclair Ross (1908–1996), Canadian author

New Zealand
 James Ross (artist) (born 1948), painter, exhibited alongside Mervyn Williams

Trinidad and Tobago 
Jimmy James Ross (1936–2000), singer

United Kingdom 
James Ross, 4th Lord Ross (died 1581), Scottish nobleman and an adherent to the cause of Mary, Queen of Scots
James Ross, 6th Lord Ross (died 1633), Scottish nobleman
James Ross, 7th Lord Ross (died 1636), Scottish nobleman
James Ross (conductor), British conductor
James Ross (surgeon) (1911–1997), Scottish surgeon
Sir James Clark Ross (1800–1862), British polar explorer
Sir James Ross, 1st Baronet (1895–1980), British surgeon

United States 
James Ross (mayor), mayor of Lancaster, Pennsylvania, 1934–1938
James Ross (American author) (1911–1990)
James Francis Ross (1931–2010), American philosopher
Jimmy D. Ross (1936–2012), retired United States Army general
Jamie Ross (born 1939), American actor
James William Ross IV (born 1988), American drag queen

Other uses 
 RRS James Clark Ross, a 1990 British Antarctic Survey ship
 Jamie Ross (Law & Order), a character on Law & Order
 Jimmy Ross, a character in The Airmail Mystery

Ross, James